Galaxius Mons is a group of mountains in the Cebrenia quadrangle of Mars, located at 34.76 North and 217.69 West.  It is 22 km (13.7 miles) in diameter.  The mountain range has a "classical albedo name".  The term "Mons" is used for a mountain.

References

See also

 Geography of Mars
 Geology of Mars
 HiRISE
 List of mountains on Mars by height

Cebrenia quadrangle
Mountains on Mars